The Magdalene Sisters is a 2002 drama film written and directed by Peter Mullan, about three teenage girls who were sent to Magdalene asylums (also known as 'Magdalene Laundries') homes for women who were labelled as "fallen" by their families or society. The homes were maintained by individual religious orders in the Roman Catholic Church in Ireland.

Peter Mullan has remarked that the film was initially made because victims of Magdalene asylums had received no closure in the form of recognition, compensation or apology, and many remained lifelong devout Catholics. Former Magdalene inmate Mary-Jo McDonagh told Mullan that the reality of the Magdalene asylums was much worse than depicted in the film. Historians have questioned and refuted some of the depictions of these institutions in the film.

Though set in Ireland, the film was shot entirely on location in Dumfries and Galloway, South-West Scotland.  The film was distributed by Miramax.

The convent used for the film location was badly damaged by fire on 9 August 2022; it had been St Benedict's Convent in West Dumfries.

Plot
In Ireland, 1964, so-called "fallen" women are considered sinners who needed to be redeemed. Four young women – Margaret (raped by her cousin), Bernadette (too beautiful and coquettish), Rose (an unmarried mother) and Crispina (an intellectually disabled unmarried mother) – are forced by their families or caretakers into the Magdalene asylum.
The film details the disastrous lives of the four girls whilst they are inmates, portraying their harsh daily regimen and their squalid living conditions at the laundries.

Each woman suffers horrific cruelty and violence from the Mother Superior. Sister Bridget, despite her gentle-faced appearance and outwardly soft-spoken demeanour, is characterised as sadistic and almost inhuman at times, as conveyed through her merciless beating of Rose in full view of Bernadette, or when she mockingly laughs at Una as she hopelessly clutches at her fallen hair locks.

Sister Bridget relishes the money the business receives and it is suggested that little of it is distributed appropriately. Those who liken themselves to Mary Magdalene, who deprived herself of all pleasures of the flesh including food and drink, eat hearty breakfasts of buttered toast and bacon while the working women subsist on oatmeal. In one particularly humiliating scene, the women are forced to stand naked in a line after taking a communal shower. The nuns then hold a "contest" on who has the most pubic hair, biggest bottom, biggest breasts and smallest breasts. The corruption of the resident priest, Father Fitzroy, is made very clear through his sexual abuse of Crispina. However, as the years pass, automatic washing machines start to appear, a modern household appliance whose growing ubiquity would eventually fatally undermine the economic viability of commercial laundries and make the Magdalene asylums unsustainable.

Three of the girls are shown, to some extent, to triumph over their situation and their captors. Margaret, although she is allowed to leave by the intervention of her younger brother, does not leave the asylum without leaving her mark. When she deliberately asks Sister Bridget to step aside for her to freely pass and is sharply shot down, Margaret falls to her knees in prayer. The Mother Superior is so surprised, she only moves past her after the Bishop tells her to come along. Bernadette and Rose finally decide to escape together, trashing Sister Bridget's study in search for the key to the asylum door and engaging her in a suspenseful confrontation. The two girls escape her clutches and are helped to return to the real world by a sympathetic relative, their story optimistically ending when Rose boards a coach bound for the ferry to Liverpool and Bernadette becomes an apprentice hairdresser. Crispina's end, however, is not a happy one; she spends the rest of her days in a mental institution (where she was sent to silence her from revealing the sexual abuse she suffered at the hands of Father Fitzroy) and dies of anorexia at age 24. The film's script is fictional, but based on four testimonies reported in the documentary Sex in a Cold Climate. Some have challenged the historical accuracy of some aspects of the film.

Cast
 Anne-Marie Duff: Margaret McGuire
 Nora-Jane Noone: Bernadette Harvey
 Dorothy Duffy: Patrica/Rose Dunne
 Eileen Walsh: Harriet/Crispina
 Geraldine McEwan: Sister Bridget
 Daniel Costello: Father Fitzroy
 Mary Murray: Una O'Connor
 Frances Healy: Sister Jude
 Eithne McGuinness: Sister Clementine
 Phyllis MacMahon: Sister Augusta
 Britta Smith: Katy
 Rebecca Walsh: Josephine
 Eamonn Owens: Eamonn, Margaret's brother
 Chris Patrick-Simpson: Brendan
 Pete Rose: Seamus

Critical reception
The film received critical acclaim when it was premiered at the Venice Film Festival in 2002. There, Mullan was awarded the festival's highest prize, the Golden Lion. As of 2021, the review aggregator Rotten Tomatoes reported that 91% of critics and 89% of viewers gave the film positive reviews, based on 144 reviews. Metacritic reported the film had an average score of 83 out of 100, based on 38 reviews – indicating "universal acclaim". This made it the twentieth best reviewed film of the year. The film appeared on several US critics' top ten lists of the best films of 2003.

 3rd: Ty Burr, The Boston Globe
 6th: Michael Wilmington, Chicago Tribune
 6th: Owen Gleiberman, Entertainment Weekly
 7th: Jack Mathews, Daily News (New York)
 8th: Carla Meyer, San Francisco Chronicle
 9th: V.A. Musetto, New York Post
 10th: Claudia Puig, USA Today

See also
 Magdalene Laundries in Ireland
 Mary Norris

References

External links
 
 

2002 films
2002 drama films
British drama films
Irish drama films
English-language Irish films
Films critical of the Catholic Church
Films about Catholic nuns
British films based on actual events
Golden Lion winners
Catholic Church sexual abuse scandals in Ireland
Media coverage of Catholic Church sexual abuse scandals
Feminism and the arts
Feminism and history
Films about sexual repression
Films set in Ireland
Films set in the 1960s
Christian feminism
Films about sexual harassment
2002 in Christianity
Films scored by Craig Armstrong (composer)
Films directed by Peter Mullan
2000s English-language films
2000s British films
English-language drama films